Trichopsomyia banksi , the white-faced psyllid killer, is an uncommon species of syrphid fly observed  across North America. Hoverflies can remain nearly motionless in flight. The adults are also known as flower flies for they are commonly found on flowers from which they get both energy-giving nectar and protein-rich pollen. Larvae are  unknown but other members of this genus are psyllid, aphid and Phylloxera predators.

Distribution
Illinois, Virginia (type specimen), Nebraska and Florida.

References 

Diptera of North America
Hoverflies of North America
Pipizinae
Taxa named by Charles Howard Curran 
Insects described in 1921